Abbreviations are common in Japanese; these include many Latin alphabet letter combinations, generally pronounced as initialisms. Some of these combinations are common in English, but others are unique to Japan or of Japanese origin, and form a kind of wasei eigo (Japanese-coined English).

This is a list of Latin alphabet letter combinations used in Japan.

A
 ADV – adventure game (also abbreviated as AVG)
 AV – adult video
 AV – audio-visual
 AVG – adventure game (also abbreviated as ADV)

B
 BGM – background music
 BL – Boys Love
 BS – Broadcast Satellite (Direct-broadcast satellite; also a prefix for BS stations)

C
 CM – commercial message (television advertisement)
 CS – Communication Satellite 
 CV – character voice (voice actor)

D
 DT – 
 DV – Domestic Violence

E
 ED – ending (an animated sequence which includes the closing credits, often used regarding anime)

 EV – elevator

G
 GW – Golden Week

H
 H – hentai, alternately written as ecchi; the meanings of these two terms have diverged.
 HP – home page (website)

I
 IC card — contactless smart card (derives from the initialism IC which is occasionally used for an integrated circuit in English, although the meaning of the complete term is likely non-obvious for English speakers)

J
 JC – 
 JH – Japan Highway Public Corporation
 JK – 
 JK – 
 JR – Japan Railway
 JS – 
 JSDF – Japan Self-Defense Forces (also abbreviated as SDF)

K
 KY – ; refers to someone who is unable to read a social situation.
 KSK – ; an increasingly popular way to propose among young people.

L
 LDK – Living Dining Kitchen; home type where the kitchen is merged to the living room
 LDP – the Liberal Democratic Party of Japan

M
 M – masochism (or characterized by or pertaining to it)
 MC – Master of ceremonies
 MV – music video

N
 N'EX – Narita Express
 NG  – no good (wasei-eigo term meaning the opposite of okay)
 NHK – 
 NJS –  — Japanese Keirin Association

O
 OA – office automation (i.e. the computerization of offices), opening act (as in live music performances)
 OB – old boy (male former student (alumnus), club member, teammate, employee, etc.)
 OG – old girl (female former student (alumnus), club member, teammate, employee, etc.)
 OL – office lady (a female office worker)
 ONA - original net animation (anime directly released onto the Internet)
 OP – opening (title sequence, often used regarding anime)
 OSV – original sound version (video game soundtrack)
 OVA – original video animation (also abbreviated as OAV)

P
 PS – police station
 PV – promotional video (usually refers specifically to music videos)

R
 RPG – role-playing game (usually refers to role-playing video games)

S
 S – sadism (or characterized by or pertaining to it)
 SD – super déformé (super deformed)
 SDF – Japan Self-Defense Forces (also abbreviated as JSDF)
 SNS – Social networking service, social website
 SS – service station
 STG – shooting game (shoot 'em up video game)

T
 TQB – 
 TPO – Time, Place, Occasion

U
 UMA – unidentified mysterious animal (cryptid); coined in connection with unidentified flying object

V
 VG – video game
 VTR – video tele-replay (the display of pre-recorded footage)

W
 w – laugh out loud 

Japanese vocabulary